"Born to Be Wild" is a 1968 rock song by Steppenwolf.

Born to Be Wild may also refer to:

Film and television
 Born to Be Wild (1938 film), an action/drama written by Nathanael West
 Born to Be Wild (1995 film), an American family comedy
 Born to Be Wild (2011 film), an American 3D IMAX documentary about orphaned orangutans and elephants
 Born to Be Wild (TV program), a 2007 Philippine travel and wildlife program
 "Born to Be Wild" (Roseanne), a 1990 television episode
 "Born to Be Wild" (SpongeBob SquarePants), a 2007 television episode

Music
 Born to Be Wild (album), a 1988 album by MC Shan
 Born to Be Wild – A Retrospective, a 1991 album by Steppenwolf

See also
 Born to Be Mild (disambiguation)